Heavy breath may refer to:

 Breathing heavily (deep/fast/hard)
 A symptom possibly indicating the presence of a disease or abnormality
 "Heavy Breath", a song from the 2009 indie rock album Curse Your Branches by David Bazan
 Heavy breath play, an erotic fetish

Heavy breathing may refer to:

 Heavy Breathing, a character in the late 1960s/early 1970s British sitcom The Dustbinmen
 Heavy Breathing: Poems, 1967-1980, a book by Philip Whalen
 "Heavy Breathing", a song from the emo pop punk post-hardcore album Resolution by Hidden in Plain View
 "Heavy Breathing", a song from the 1974 pop rock album Mr. Natural by the Bee Gees
 Heavy Breathing, Washington D.C. dance/noise rock band established in 2010

See also
 Heavy (disambiguation)
 Breath (disambiguation)